Savo Gazivoda (born 22 July 1994) is a Montenegrin football midfielder, playing for Mornar.

Club career
Born in Podgorica, Gazivoda started playing football with FK Drezga, and later moved to Budućnost Podgorica. He made his senior debut for Budućnost in the last fixture match of the 2010–11 Montenegrin First League season, against Sutjeska Nikšić at the age of 16. Gazivoda was also loaned to Dečić and OFK Petrovac between 2012 and 2013 before he joined Mogren in summer 2013. After he did not make any appearance for the club during the first half-season, he moved to Rudar Pljevlja where he played until the end of 2013–14 season. In summer 2014, Gazivoda returned to Budućnost Podgorica. He scored his first goal for Budućnost in the first game he played in the 2014–15 Montenegrin First League season, when he was substituted in during the 9th fixture match and later pointed for 1–0 victory against Berane. For his second spell with Budućnost, Gazivoda made 15 appearances with 1 goal in all competitions between 2014 and 2015. For the spring half of the 2015–16 season, Gazivoda joined the Serbian First League side ČSK Čelarevo, where he made 6 appearances. In summer 2016 he signed a three-year professional contract with Spartak Subotica, but shortly after moved on one-year loan to Extremadura UD. After breaking the contract with Spartak, Gazivoda joined Radnik Surdulica at the beginning of 2017, signing two-and-a-half year deal with new club. In summer 2017, Gazivoda moved to Radnički Niš.

In February 2019, Gazivoda joined FK Kom.

References

External links
 
 
 Savo Gazivoda profile & stats at Football Association of Montenegro
 Savo Gazivoda profile & stats at sofoot.com
 

1994 births
Living people
Footballers from Podgorica
Association football midfielders
Montenegrin footballers
Montenegro youth international footballers
FK Budućnost Podgorica players
FK Dečić players
OFK Petrovac players
FK Mogren players
FK Rudar Pljevlja players
FK ČSK Čelarevo players
FK Spartak Subotica players
Extremadura UD footballers
FK Radnik Surdulica players
FK Radnički Niš players
FK Iskra Danilovgrad players
FK Bokelj players
FK Kom players
FK Rad players
FK Mornar players
Montenegrin First League players
Serbian First League players
Segunda División B players
Serbian SuperLiga players
Montenegrin expatriate footballers
Expatriate footballers in Serbia
Montenegrin expatriate sportspeople in Serbia
Expatriate footballers in Spain
Montenegrin expatriate sportspeople in Spain